Zhao Chaojun (born January 15, 1988) is a Chinese male weightlifter.

He won a silver medal in the 2011 World Weightlifting Championships – Men's 56 kg event.

References

1988 births
World Weightlifting Championships medalists
Living people
Chinese male weightlifters
21st-century Chinese people